William Merchant Richardson (January 4, 1774 – March 15, 1838) was a member of the U.S. House of Representatives from Massachusetts and chief justice of the New Hampshire Supreme Court.

Biography
He was born in Pelham in the Province of New Hampshire in 1774. He graduated from Harvard University in 1797; studied law; was admitted to the bar and commenced practice in Groton, Massachusetts, in 1804. He was elected as a Democratic-Republican to the Twelfth Congress to fill the vacancy caused by the resignation of Joseph B. Varnum; and was reelected to the Thirteenth Congress and served from November 4, 1811, to April 18, 1814, when he resigned.

Richardson moved to Portsmouth, New Hampshire, in 1814. He became a United States Attorney in 1814; and in 1816 was appointed chief justice of New Hampshire and served as chief justice until his death in 1838 in Chester, New Hampshire, where he is buried in the Old Cemetery. Dartmouth College gave him the degree of LL.D. He was elected a member of the American Antiquarian Society in 1819.

Publications
He is the author of the New Hampshire Justice (Concord, 1824) and The Town Officer (1824) and was co-reporter of the New Hampshire Superior Court Cases, of which the reports of several volumes are his alone (11 vols., 1819–'44). He is the subject of a Life (Concord, 1839).

Family
He was the father of Anne, grandfather of sculptor Daniel Chester French, and uncle of William Adams Richardson who was United States Secretary of the Treasury from 1873 to 1874.

Notes

References

External links 
 

1774 births
1838 deaths
Harvard University alumni
Chief Justices of the New Hampshire Supreme Court
Democratic-Republican Party members of the United States House of Representatives from Massachusetts
People from Groton, Massachusetts
People from Pelham, New Hampshire
Members of the American Antiquarian Society